"Love Story" is the third single by British progressive rock group Jethro Tull. It was released in late November 1968. It reached No. 29 in the UK Singles Chart in January 1969, spending eight weeks on that chart.

The original UK single was released on 29 November 1968 with the B-side "Christmas Song". In the U.S., "Love Story" was released on 12 February 1969, with "A Song for Jeffrey" on the B-side. "Love Story" and "Christmas Song" did not appear on an album until the 1972 compilation Living in the Past,  but "A Song for Jeffrey" did appear on the band's first album, This Was (1968).

Personnel
Jethro Tull
 Ian Anderson – flute, mandolin, lead vocals
 Mick Abrahams – wah-wah guitar
 Glenn Cornick – bass guitar
 Clive Bunker – drums

Additional personnel
 Terry Ellis - producer

See also
 Jethro Tull: This Was (1968)

References

1968 singles
Jethro Tull (band) songs
Songs written by Ian Anderson
Song recordings produced by Ian Anderson
1968 songs
Island Records singles
Fontana Records singles
Reprise Records singles